Tunisia competed at the 2022 Mediterranean Games in Oran, Algeria over 10 days from 25 June to 6 July 2022 with delegation of 263 persons (175 athletes in 24 sports).

Medals

Medal table

|  style="text-align:left; width:78%; vertical-align:top;"|

|  style="text-align:left; width:22%; vertical-align:top;"|

Swimming 

Men

References 

Nations at the 2022 Mediterranean Games
2022
Mediterranean Games